The National Centre for Universities and Business (NCUB) develops, promotes and supports collaboration between universities and business in the United Kingdom. NCUB is a trading name of the Council for Industry and Higher Education, a registered charity.

NCUB is headed by Dr Joe Marshall (Chief Executive) and Sam Laidlaw (Chair). The body's Leadership Council has representation from the UK's businesses and universities.

Predecessor 
The Council for Industry and Higher Education (CIHE) was born in 1986 from the collaboration of James Prior, John Cassels and Pauline Perry. Perry (at that time the Chief Inspector of Schools at the Department for Education) had heard about an American organisation that had managed to bring businesses and universities closer together. Cassels (as Director General of the National Economic Development Office) was a believer in the power of partnership, while Prior was a recent Cabinet member and the new chairman of the GEC industrial conglomerate. He agreed to invite the heads of a range of businesses, universities and polytechnics to a couple of initial discussions to see if there was a common cause that might be addressed through a partnership approach.

CIHE was registered as a charity and a private company limited by guarantee in 1997.

The council is funded by its member organisations and by external organisations. The funding sources included universities, other organisations and companies. Each member organisation appointed one person to the council, and seven of them were trustees. In the time leading up to the 2013 reorganisation, the chairman of CIHE was Richard Greenhalgh.

Formation
Sir Tim Wilson's review of university-business collaboration, published in February 2012, made 30 recommendations. One of them was that the CIHE develop to become the focal point of such collaboration, as a membership charity. In response, and at the request of the Department for Business, Innovation and Skills, CIHE adopted the National Centre for Universities and Business (NCUB) trading name in 2013. 

Following the announcement, the four UK research funding councils – through RCUK and the Technology Strategy Board (TSB) (now Innovate UK) – agreed to help fund NCUB. NCUB was launched with an event at the BT Tower, with David Docherty and Richard Greenhalgh becoming the organisation's first CEO and Chairman respectively.

References 

Business education in the United Kingdom
Educational charities based in the United Kingdom
Higher education organisations based in the United Kingdom